Stefánsdóttir is an Icelandic patronymic, used by:

Dóra Stefánsdóttir (born 1985), retired Icelandic footballer who last played for Swedish club LdB FC Malmö
Erla Stefánsdóttir (1935–2015), Icelandic self-proclaimed seer and public commentator on the topic of the huldufólk
Greta Salóme Stefánsdóttir (born 1986), Icelandic singer and violinist in the Iceland Symphony Orchestra
Hanna Guðrún Stefánsdóttir (born 1979), Icelandic team handball player
Ragna Lóa Stefánsdóttir (born 1966), Icelandic former football player
Sigrún Stefánsdóttir (born 1947), the head of radio and television of RÚV, the National Icelandic Broadcasting Service
Sóley Stefánsdóttir (born 1987), Icelandic multi-instrumentalist, singer, and songwriter
Þórey Rósa Stefánsdóttir (born 1989), Icelandic team handball player